Lithops viridis, the green rock-plant, is a species of plant in the family Aizoaceae. Its rocklike leaves protect it from predators. Its leaves are succulent. The daisy-like flowers close at night, and this one is one of the handful of Lithops with green leaves. Its two leaves are formed like a sprouting bean.

viridis
Plants described in 1958